Which Way Iz West is the thirteenth studio album by American rapper MC Eiht. It was released on June 30, 2017 through Year Round Records and Blue Stamp Music. The album features guest appearances from WC, B-Real, The Lady of Rage, Bumpy Knuckles, Kurupt, Xzibit, Outlawz and his group Compton's Most Wanted,  among others. The album is executively produced by DJ Premier, and features production from Austrian producer Brenk Sinatra.

Track listing

Charts

References

2017 albums
MC Eiht albums
Albums produced by DJ Premier